Tomb KV10, located in the Valley of the Kings near the modern-day Egyptian city of Luxor, was cut and decorated for the burial of Pharaoh Amenmesse of the Nineteenth Dynasty  of Ancient Egypt. However, there is no proof that he was actually buried here. Later, the decoration was replaced with scenes for  Takhat and Baketwernel—two royal women dating to the late 20th Dynasty.

It was visited by Richard Pococke, Jean-François Champollion and Karl Richard Lepsius, and briefly studied by Edward R. Ayrton before being properly examined by a team from the University of Memphis in the United States under Otto Schaden in 1992.

References
 Reeves, N & Wilkinson, R.H. The Complete Valley of the Kings, 1996, Thames and Hudson, London.
 Siliotti, A. Guide to the Valley of the Kings and to the Theban Necropolises and Temples, 1996, A.A. Gaddis, Cairo.

External links

Theban Mapping Project: KV10 - Includes description, images and plans of the tomb.
KV-10 The Tomb of Amenmesse Project

Buildings and structures completed in the 12th century BC
Valley of the Kings